Sean Gregory Palmer (born January 23, 1973) is an American stage and screen actor, singer, and dancer. Palmer's most recognizable role on television is that of Stanford Blatch's boyfriend, Marcus, on the HBO series Sex and the City.

Career 
Palmer played Prince Eric in the stage version of The Little Mermaid, which began on January 10, 2008.

Palmer can be heard on the Original Broadway Cast recording of  The Little Mermaid and on the soundtrack of the motion picture Easy Virtue. In 2010, they appeared in a one-night only concert semi staged reading of Evening Primrose by Stephen Sondheim.

Personal life 
In October 2021, Palmer came out as non-binary, and stated their preference for they/them pronouns.

Theatre credits
On The Town: (English National Opera 2007) Chip
Crazy For You: (Open Air Theatre, Regent's Park 2011) Bobby Child
The Phantom of the Opera: (Her Majesty's Theatre 2013) Raoul, Vicomte de Chagny
The Little Mermaid: Prince Eric
The Apple Tree (Revival): Ensemble and Cover to Mr. Kudisch
Saturday Night Fever (Original): Joey and later Tony Manero
Fosse (Original): Original Cast
Dream (Original): Swing
The Boy Friend: Tony Brockhurst; directed by Julie Andrews

Filmography

Film

Television

Video games

References 

Living people
American singers
American dancers
American non-binary actors
American stage actors
American television actors
1973 births
Actors from Reno, Nevada